Doha (Urdu:  , Hindi: दोहा) is a form of self-contained rhyming couplet in poetry composed in Mātrika metre. This genre of poetry first became common in Apabhraṃśa and was  commonly used in Hindustani language poetry.

Among the most famous dohas are those of Sarahpa, Kabir, Mirabai, Rahim, Tulsidas, Surdas

A doha is a couplet consisting of two lines, each of 24 instants (Matras). The rules for distinguishing light and heavy syllables is slightly different from Sanskrit. Each line has 13 instants in first part and 11 instants in the second. The first and third quarters of doha have 13 instants which must parse as 6-4-3.

Many Hindi poets have created several books which explain whole stories and epics in the form of dohas. The most popular is Tulsidas' Ramcharitmanas, a popular rendition of the Sanskrit epic Ramayana.

Examples

Here is a Doha by Rahim:

जो रहीम उत्तम प्रकृति का कर सकत कुसंग | 
चन्दन विष व्यापत नहीं लिपटे रहत भुजंग ||

Says Rahim, one who is of inherently noble nature, will remain unaffected even when he associates with bad people.
The sandalwood plant does not absorb poison when the snakes wind around it.

See also
 Chaupai (poetry)
 Songs of realization
 Chhand (poetry)
 Doha (Indian literature)
 Hanuman Chalisa

References

External links
 Doha Collection in Kavita Kosh
 Kabir
कबीर के दोहे

Stanzaic form
Indian poetics
Poetic rhythm
Hindi-language literature